Andrea Chandler is an American farmer, writer, and retired sailor. After enlisting in the United States Navy in 1998, Chandler worked as a guided missile specialist on various destroyers, serving in Operation Iraqi Freedom, for which they were awarded the Navy Achievement Medal. Retiring in 2008, they worked on missile systems at a defense contractor before switching to small-scale agriculture, their interest spurred by 4 chickens they had been given as a wedding gift.

As a farmer and science communicator, Chandler has worked with The Livestock Conservancy and been covered in The Independent and The Piedmont Virginian. As a Navy veteran and commentator on veterans' issues, they has been published or quoted in AlterNet, Quartz, and XoJane.

References 

Living people
Farmers from Virginia
United States Navy sailors
United States Navy personnel of the Iraq War
Year of birth missing (living people)